Butarque is an administrative neighborhood (barrio) of Madrid belonging to the district of Villaverde.

Wards of Madrid
Villaverde (Madrid)